
Lithuania is divided into three layers of administrative divisions. The first-level division consists of 10 counties (Lithuanian: singular – apskritis, plural – apskritys). These are sub-divided into 60 municipalities (Lithuanian: plural – savivaldybės, singular – savivaldybė), which in turn are further sub-divided into over 500 smaller groups, known as elderships (Lithuanian: plural – seniūnijos, singular – seniūnija).

At the end of its tenure as a Soviet Socialist Republic, Lithuania's administrative divisions consisted of 44 regions, 12 cities, 80 towns, 19 settlements, and 426 rural districts. The reform of this system was an immediate concern for the new government. The Constitution of Lithuania, ratified in 1992, delegated the power of establishing future administrative units to the Lithuanian Parliament (Seimas). Accordingly, the Seimas passed two fundamental laws: a 1993 law on government representation and a 1994 law specifying the territorial-administrative units and their boundaries. The current system of a set of municipalities under 10 counties was codified by 1995. Several changes were made in 2000, resulting in 60 municipalities.

Ordinary municipal councilors are elected every four years from electoral lists using proportional representation. The mayor, who is a member of the council, is elected directly by the residents in a majority vote in run-off election. Before 2015, the mayors were elected by the municipal councils.

The largest municipality by population in Lithuania is Vilnius City Municipality with 542,626 residents, home to one fifth of the country's population. The smallest municipality by population is Neringa Municipality with 2,879 residents.

Powers and functions
Municipalities are established to perform certain functions provided by law. According to the abovementioned Republic of Lithuania Law on Local Self-Government, the functions of municipalities are “functions related to local government, public administration and provision of public services defined by the Constitution and attributed to municipalities by this and other laws”. The processes of integration into international organizations - like the EU and NATO - are considered to be important external factors influencing the development of municipal powers in the country. Lithuania, which has become a member of these organizations, has been assigned completely new responsibilities, some of which, naturally, also belonged to municipalities. In the case of EU integration, municipalities have been assigned the necessary information supply to the European Commission, and in the case of integration into NATO, municipalities have had new functions related to security issues.

Municipalities

See also
ISO 3166-2:LT

 Administrative divisions of Lithuania
 Counties (Lithuanian: singular – apskritis, plural – apskritys)
 Elderships (or wards) (Lithuanian: plural – seniūnijos, singular – seniūnija).
 Seniūnaitija (sub-eldership)
 Cities (Lithuanian: plural – miestai, singular – miestas)
 Towns (Lithuanian: plural – miesteliai, singular – miestelis)

Notes and references
Notes

References

Sources

 
Subdivisions of Lithuania
Lithuania, Municipalities
Lithuania 2
Municipalities, Lithuania
Lithuania
Municipalities
Lithuania